Frederick Stirton (20 July 1883 – 30 July 1935) was a Cape Colony cricketer. He played in one first-class match for Border in 1906/07.

See also
 List of Border representative cricketers

References

External links
 

1883 births
1935 deaths
Cricketers from Cape Colony
Border cricketers